Zhang Jin may refer to:

Zhang Jin (Three Kingdoms), warlord of the Three Kingdoms era
, Yuan dynasty government minister
Zhang Jin (physical chemist) (born 1969), Chinese physical chemist
Zhang Jin (badminton) (born 1972), Chinese badminton player
Jin Zhang (biochemist) (born 1972), Chinese-American biochemist
Max Zhang Jin (born 1974), Chinese actor
Zhang Jin (gymnast) (born 2000), Chinese gymnast
John J. Zhang or Zhang Jin, Chinese-American scientist

See also
Zhang Jing (disambiguation)